NSML may refer to:

Naisten SM-liiga, another name for Naisten Liiga, an elite women's hockey league in Finland
Noonan syndrome with multiple lentigines, a rare autosomal dominant multisystem disease